Kai Bumann (16 August 1961 – 2 June 2022) was a German conductor who led orchestras and opera companies mainly in Poland, such as the Opera Krakowska, Warsaw Chamber Opera and the Polish Baltic Philharmonic. He was conductor and artistic director of the Swiss Youth Symphony Orchestra (SJSO) from 1998 until his death.

Career 
Born in 1961 in West Berlin, Bumann studied at the Berlin University of the Arts and first worked as répétiteur, from 1986 at Theater Trier and from 1988 at Theater Freiburg. In 1989, he became the 1st Kapellmeister at the Landestheater Detmold, where he was interim Generalmusikdirektor (GMD) the following season. He was in the same position at the Hessisches Staatstheater Wiesbaden in the 1996/97 season.

In 1997, he became chief conductor of the Opera Krakowska. He first conducted at the Deutsche Oper Berlin in 1998, followed by regular appearances until 2003. The same year, he also became conductor and artistic director of the Swiss Youth Symphony Orchestra (SJSO), a position he held until his death. In 2016 they performed at Tonhalle St. Gallen. He celebrated the orchestra's 50th anniversary in 2020, due to the COVID-19 pandemic with a reduced group. In 2021, he led the orchestra in an event of the Lucerne Festival, themed "Music for Future". They played Mozart's Piano Concerto No. 21 and Beethoven's First Symphony, standing throughout, with well-balanced sound and dedication to detail. In April 2022 they were part of Through the Night's episode "Europe's Young Performers", a BBC Radio 3 program.

Bumann was musical director of the Warsaw Chamber Opera from 2003 to 2013, beginning with Verdi's Falstaff. They toured to France, Spain, and to Japan in 2004 and 2006. He was also chief conductor of the Polish Baltic Philharmonic from 2008 to 2012. From 2013, he was first guest conductor of the Łódź Philharmonic.

He was named Professor of Art by the Polish President, Andrzej Duda, in 2021.

Bumann was a friend of many personalities in Polish cultural life, and conducted the world premiere of Krzysztof Penderecki's Lacrimosa No. 2 for soprano, chorus and chamber orchestra, one of the composer's last works, on 6 October 2018.

Bumann died on 2 June 2022 in a hospital in Nowy Targ of a heart attack, aged 60. He was buried in Łopuszna.

Awards and honors 

 1994: Second prize at the Geneva International Music Competition
 2014: Medal for Merit to Culture – Gloria Artis

Recordings 
 2006: Bartók: Viola Concerto, Peter Mieg: Triple concerto dans le gôut italien, Dvořák: Symphony No. 8; with Lea Boesch (viola), Schweizer Jugend-Sinfonie-Orchester
 2008: Feliks Janiewicz, Violin Concertos No. 3 and 5, with Zbigniew Pilch (violin), Musicae Antiquae Collegium Varsoviense, TAKT PMC 057
 2016: Mahler, Ninth Symphony; Schweizer Jugend-Sinfonie-Orchester, live recording.
 2017: Przeboje 55-lecia, works by J. S. Bach and W. A. Mozart, with Helena Bregar (soprano), Tomasz Gluska (trompet), Capella Bydgostiensis; DUX 1427

Writing

References

External links 
 
 
 

1961 births
2022 deaths
20th-century German conductors (music)
21st-century German conductors (music)
Musicians from Berlin
Recipients of the Bronze Medal for Merit to Culture – Gloria Artis